

Belgium
 Belgian Congo – Eugène Henry, Governor-General of the Belgian Congo (1916–1921)

France
 French Somaliland – Jules Gérard Auguste Lauret, Governor of French Somaliland (1918–1924)
 Guinea –
 Jean Louis Georges Poiret, Lieutenant-Governor of Guinea (1915–1919)
 Fernand Lavit, acting Lieutenant-Governor of Guinea (1919–1920)

Japan
 Karafuto –
Masaya Akira, Governor-General of Karafuto (13 October 1916 – 17 April 1919)
Nagai Kinjirō, Governor-General of Karafuto(17 April 1919 – 11 June 1924)
 Korea –
Hasegawa Yoshimichi, Governor-General of Korea (1916–1919)
Saitō Makoto, Governor-General of Korea (1919–1927)
 Taiwan – Den Kenjirō, Governor-General of Taiwan (31 October 1919-September 1923)

Portugal
 Angola –
 Filomeno da Câmara Melo Cabral, Governor-General of Angola (1918–1919)
 Mimoso Guera, Governor-General of Angola (1919–1920)

United Kingdom
 Malta Colony
Paul Methuen, Governor of Malta (1915–1919)
Herbert Plumer, Governor of Malta (1919–1924)
 Northern Rhodesia – Sir Lawrence Aubrey Wallace, Administrator of Northern Rhodesia (1911–1921)

Colonial governors
Colonial governors
1919